East Jakarta is the largest of the five administrative cities (kota administrasi) which form the Special Capital Region of Jakarta, Indonesia. It had a population of 2,693,896 at the 2010 Census and 3,037,139 at the 2020 Census, making it also the most populous of the five administrative cities within Jakarta. East Jakarta is not self-governed and does not have a city council, hence it is not classified as a proper municipality.

East Jakarta is bounded by North Jakarta to the north, Bekasi to the east, Depok to the south, and South Jakarta and Central Jakarta to the west.

The mayor's office is located in the Administrative Village (Kelurahan) of Pulo Gebang, in Cakung District.

Districts 
East Jakarta is subdivided into ten districts (kecamatan), listed below with their areas and their populations at the 2010 Census and 2020 Census:

Economy 
Aviastar Mandiri has its head office in East Jakarta.

In the past, in East Jakarta, there are 23 Sugar mills such as Setu, Jatiwarna, Ceger, Kalijereng, Pedongkelan (Cimanggis), Palsigunung, Klender, Pondokjati and Cibubur is open in 1914 and is closed due to the 1997 Asian financial crisis.

The sugar mills were first open in Klender (: Suikerfabriek Klender) in 1905.

Transportation
Halim Perdanakusuma International Airport serves a limited customer base; typically within an hour flight of the airport.
Kampung Rambutan Bus Terminal mainly provides service to inter-provincial, inter-city buses.
Pulogebang inter-city and inter-province bus terminal, opened on June 23, 2012.

References

External links

 Official site